Małgorzata Agnieszka Łazarczyk (née Rdest, born 14 January 1993 in Żyrardów) is a Polish female racing driver and businesswoman. She currently competes in the Alpine Elf Europa Cup.

Racing career
Rdest entered car racing in 2012 when she, as reigning Polish Junior Karting Champion, was scouted by BMW Motorsport. They would enter her in the final round of the Formula BMW Talent Cup for rookie drivers at Oschersleben, where she would finish all three races in the top 10 and finish 10th in the standings despite only entering the one event. She would move up to the BRDC Formula 4 Championship the following year, joining Douglas Motorsport alongside Sennan Fielding. Competing alongside more experienced drivers in open-wheelers, she would struggle to 18th in the standings having completed the full season and scoring a best finish of 11th at Snetterton – however, despite the lack of results, she would claim the "Who Zooms" award for the most overtakes over the course of the season.

She would move into one-make racing for 2014, entering the Central European Volkswagen Polo Cup. She would end the season 14th, with a best result of 6th in her home race at Tor Poznań before stepping up to the Audi Sport TT Cup for 2015. Rdest would compete in all three sanctioned seasons of the TT Cup, with a best result of second at both races in the 2017 season-opener at the Hockenheimring, and a best championship position of 6th in the same season. She would move across to GT4 competition in 2018, remaining with the Audi marque through German team Phoenix Racing and competing in both the International Cup with Max Hesse (finishing 9th) and the Central European Cup round at the Nürburgring alongside Óscar Tunjo, scoring a pole and race win.

Rdest would be selected to qualify for the W Series in 2019, and would be accepted as one of the 18 permanent drivers. She would score points in the first race at Hockenheim, however would be taken out by Esmee Hawkey in Zolder and struggled to thirteenth in Misano. She would qualify fourth at the Norisring, but sustained front wing damage in a first-corner skirmish with Fabienne Wohlwend and finished 14th and a lap down. A season-best sixth-place finish would follow at TT Circuit Assen, before 13th in the final round at Brands Hatch saw the Pole fail to automatically qualify for the 2020 W Series – ending the championship in 14th.

Rdest would return to GT racing in 2020, contesting the French-based Alpine Europa Cup. This followed a class win at the washed-out Dubai 24 Hour in January. She would be announced as a reserve driver for 2021 W Series season and would fulfill her role replacing Tasmin Pepper at the Red Bull Ring. She would place 9th in the first round and 17th in the second one.

Personal life
In November 2021 Rdest became vice-president of Emka S.A., a Polish medical waste management company.

Rdest married Karoł Łazarczyk in June 2022.

Racing record

Career summary

* Season still in progress.

Dubai 24 Hour results

 – Race abandoned after 7 hours due to circuit flooding.

Complete W Series results
(key) (Races in bold indicate pole position) (Races in italics indicate fastest lap)

* Season still in progress.

References

External links

Profile at Driver Database
Website

Polish racing drivers
1993 births
Living people
People from Żyrardów
W Series drivers
24H Series drivers
Audi Sport TT Cup drivers
International GT Open drivers
Phoenix Racing drivers
Formula BMW drivers
Michelin Pilot Challenge drivers
GT4 European Series drivers
Engstler Motorsport drivers
Polish female racing drivers